Ellsworth Community High School is a public school serving grades 9 through 12 in Ellsworth, Pierce County, Wisconsin, United States.

Academics
Ellsworth Community High School offers a wide range of class selections in subjects including English, Mathematics, Science, History, Social Studies, Music, Physical Education, Agricultural Sciences, Technical Education, Family and Consumer Education, and Business and Marketing. Advanced Placement classes are available. They include AP Literature and Composition, AP United States History, AP Biology, and AP Calculus.

Athletics
Ellsworth, Wisconsin's athletics participate in the Middle Border Conference. The Middle Border Conference consists of seven other schools in Wisconsin including Amery, Baldwin-Woodville, New Richmond, Osceola, Prescott, Somerset, and St. Croix Central. Yet their main rival has always seemingly been Prescott.

References

External links
Ellsworth Community School District
Village of Ellsworth

Public high schools in Wisconsin
Schools in Pierce County, Wisconsin